Bujor may refer to:

Given name
 Bujor Hălmageanu (1941–2018), Romanian retired association football defender and manager
 Bujor Hoinic (born 1950), Romanian pianist, conductor, conservatory professor and opera composer
 Bujor Nedelcovici (born 1936), Romanian novelist, essayist, playwright and screenwriter

Surname
 Flavia Bujor (born 1988), French novelist of Romanian origin
 Gabriel Bujor (born 1990), Romanian handball player
 Leonid Bujor (born 1955, Moldovan politician
 Loredana Bujor (born 1972), Romanian retired professional tennis player
 Metodie Bujor (born 1974), classically trained baritone and popular Russian singer
 Mihail Gheorghiu Bujor (1881-1964), Romanian politician
 Paul Bujor (1862-1952), Romanian zoologist, writer and politician
 Vlad Bujor (born 1989), Romanian footballer

Places 
In Romania:
 Bujor, a village in Vârvoru de Jos Commune, Dolj County
 Bujor, a village in Miheșu de Câmpie Commune, Mureș County
 Bujorul, a tributary of the Chineja in Galați County
 Târgu Bujor, a town in Galați County

In Moldova:
 Bujor, Hînceşti, a commune in Raionul Hînceşti